The decade of the 1770s in archaeology involved some significant events.

Explorations 
 1773: Don Ramon de Ordoñez y Aguilar examines the ruins of Palenque and sends a report to the Captain General at Antigua Guatemala.
 1777: The ruins of Xochicalco described by explorer Antonio Alzate.

Excavations 
 1776: October - Vertical shaft sunk at Silbury Hill.
 Formal excavations continue at Pompeii.

Finds 
 1774: Discovery of reputed Roman Baths, Strand Lane, London.

Publications 
 1774: Don Bernardo Miera y Pacheco identifies the Chaco Canyon area as "Chaca" on a map. The term, a Spanish translation of a Navajo word, is thought to be the origin for "Chacra Mesa" and "Chaco".
 1775: Memoire sur Venus, by Pierre Henri Larcher.

Other events 
 1772: The British Museum acquires its first antiquities of note, Sir William Hamilton's collection of ancient Greek vases.
 1774: May 2 - The Society of Antiquaries of London open the coffin of King Edward I.
 1777: National Archaeological Museum, Naples, established.

Births 
 1771: March 10 - Georg Friedrich Creuzer, German Greek philologist and archaeologist (d. 1858)
 1773: June 13 - Thomas Young, English Egyptologist (d. 1829)
 1774: June 10 - Carl Haller von Hallerstein, German Greek archaeologist (d. 1817)
 1776
 January 4 - Bernardino Drovetti, Italian antiquarian and Egyptologist (d. 1852)
 March 12 - Lady Hester Stanhope, English archaeologist (d. 1839)
 1778: November 5 - Giovanni Battista Belzoni, Italian explorer and Egyptologist (d. 1823)
 1779: May 29 - John Disney, English barrister, antiquarian and archaeological benefactor (d. 1857)

Deaths 
 1771 Francis Drake (b. 1696)

References

Archaeology by decade
Archaeology